The World Congress of Soil Science (WCSS) is a conference held every four years (although interrupted by World War II) under the guidance of the International Union of Soil Sciences (IUSS). The purpose of a congress is to: (i) ensure the advancement of soil science and its application, and (ii) to handle the business of the society. Of the 18 congresses, eight have been held in Europe, five in the Americas, three in Asia, one in Australia and one in Africa. The congresses are only open to society members. The number of members attending has steadily increased, with approximately 2000 members attending each congress since the 15th WCSS in Acapulco, Mexico.

The 19th WCSS was held in the week of 1 to 6 August 2010 in Brisbane, Queensland, Australia at the Brisbane Convention and Exhibition Centre. The congress theme was "Soil solutions for a changing world". The conference was organised by the IUSS President (Roger Swift) and Vice-President (Neal Menzies). The 19th WCSS was the second congress held in Australia (the 9th WCSS was held in Adelaide, Australia, in 1968), and was held in conjunction with the Australian Society of Soil Science Incorporated.
The 20th WCSS was held from 8 to 13 June 2014 on Jeju-do Island, South Korea.
The 21st WCSS was held in Rio de Janeiro (Brazil) in August 2018, the 22nd in 2022 in Glasgow (Scotland, United Kingdom). The upcoming congresses are 2026 in Nanjing (China) and 2030 in Toronto (Canada).

Past and future locations for the WCSS:

Notes

External links
IUSS Official Website
19th WCSS (2010) Official Website
ASSSI Official Website
Brisbane Convention & Exhibition Centre Website

Earth science conferences
Quadrennial events
Recurring events established in 1927